The following is a listing of placenames from the Chinook Jargon, generally from the Canadian provinces of British Columbia and Alberta, the Canadian Yukon Territory and the American states of Alaska, Washington, Oregon, Idaho, and Montana. Some outliers exist in California, Utah, Nevada, the Canadian Prairies and the Great Plains States, and as far east as Michigan, Ontario, Quebec and New Hampshire; those in the Prairies/Plains and Ontario/Quebec may be assumed to have been "carried" there in the era by fur traders.

Note: multiples entries of the same name are sorted in alphabetical order by state or province.

A

B

C

D

E

H

I

K

L

M

N

0

P

S

T

W

Y

See also 
Chinook Jargon
Chinook Jargon use by English Language speakers
Owyhee
Kanaka
Skookumchuck
Skookum
Tillicum

References 

Lists of place name etymologies
Indigenous peoples in Canada-related lists
Native American-related lists